Wayne Meylan (March 2, 1946 – June 26, 1987) was an American football player.  Before playing college football at the University of Nebraska–Lincoln, he attended T.L. Handy High School in Bay City, Michigan.

Meylan played middle guard on defense for the Nebraska Cornhuskers for three years, and the team had a 25–7 record in that time. He was a consensus All-American in 1966 and 1967. In 1966, he blocked three punts and recovered two for touchdowns. Meylan set Nebraska records for most tackles in a season and most tackles in a career. He played three years in the National Football League (NFL), from 1968 to 1970, then returned to Nebraska to complete work on his degree. He joined Engineered Systems, a company doing underground work for TV systems and phone companies. He then started Meylan Enterprises in Omaha, Nebraska. This company worked on contracts in 18 states. His hobby was flying World War II fighter planes in airshows.

On June 26, 1987, Meylan, age 41, was killed when his plane crashed in Ludington, Michigan. The National Transportation Safety Board ruled that the probable cause of the accident was wind shear. He is buried in the Prospect Hill Cemetery, Elkhorn, Nebraska. Meylan was inducted into the College Football Hall of Fame in 1991.

References

1946 births
1987 deaths
American football linebackers
Cleveland Browns players
Minnesota Vikings players
Nebraska Cornhuskers football players
All-American college football players
College Football Hall of Fame inductees
Sportspeople from Bay City, Michigan
Players of American football from Michigan
Accidental deaths in Michigan
Aviators killed in aviation accidents or incidents in the United States
Burials at Prospect Hill Cemetery (North Omaha, Nebraska)
Victims of aviation accidents or incidents in 1987